Malapterurus monsembeensis is a species of electric catfish that occurs in the Congo River basin and is native to the countries of Angola, Central African Republic, the Democratic Republic of the Congo and the Republic of the Congo.  This species grows to a length of  SL.

References

 

Malapteruridae
Freshwater fish of Africa
Fish of Angola
Fish of the Central African Republic
Fish of the Democratic Republic of the Congo
Fish of the Republic of the Congo
Fish described in 2000
Strongly electric fish